Jim Alan Piper (born 13 August 1981) is a former Olympic breaststroke swimmer from Australia. He swam for Australia at the:
Olympics: 2004
World Championships: 2003, 2005, 2007
Commonwealth Games: 2002, 2006
Pan Pacific Championships: 2002
Short Course Worlds: 2002

At the 2004 Summer Olympics in Athens, he finished 19th in the 100-metre breaststroke and was a member of Australia's 9th-place men's 4×100-metre medley relay team. He also reached and swam in the final heat of the 200-metre breaststroke, where he was disqualified for using an illegal kick.

At the 2002 Commonwealth Games, he won the 200-metre breaststroke. Four years later, at the 2006 Commonwealth Games, he finished third in the event.

At the 2002 Short Course Worlds, he won the 200-metre breaststroke in a new meet record (2:07.16).

As of 2013, he is a board member of Swimming Western Australia, a state federation of Swimming Australia.

See also
 List of Commonwealth Games medallists in swimming (men)

References

1981 births
Living people
Australian male breaststroke swimmers
Olympic swimmers of Australia
Swimmers at the 2004 Summer Olympics
World record setters in swimming
Sportsmen from New South Wales
Commonwealth Games gold medallists for Australia
Medalists at the FINA World Swimming Championships (25 m)
Swimmers at the 2002 Commonwealth Games
Swimmers at the 2006 Commonwealth Games
Commonwealth Games medallists in swimming
Commonwealth Games bronze medallists for Australia
Goodwill Games medalists in swimming
Competitors at the 2001 Goodwill Games
21st-century Australian people
Medallists at the 2002 Commonwealth Games
Medallists at the 2006 Commonwealth Games